The men's 90 kg competition at the 2016 European Judo Championships was held on 23 April at the TatNeft Arena.

Results

Finals

Repechage

Pool A

Pool B

Pool C

Pool D

References

External links
 

M90
European Judo Championships Men's Middleweight